Lebanon has over 90 political parties. Since 2005, and after the assassination of former Prime Minister Rafic Hariri, the political scene has become very polarised, with most major political parties and movements becoming part of one of two big rival alliances, the March 8 Alliance mainly led by Hezbollah, Free Patriotic Movement, Amal Movement, Tayyar Al Marada and the Tashnaq and on the opposing side, the March 14 Alliance.The name "14th March alliance", dates back to the Cedar Revolution which had as its goal an end to the Syrian military occupation. The groups are ideologically divided as one of them is pro-Lebanon "The 14 March Alliance", are in favour of, "free competitive markets, rule of law, structural reforms as well as individual freedoms. On the other hand "The 8 March Alliance" mainly controlled by Hezbollah and the Amal movement prefers more open relations with sanctioned eastern countries such as Iran for financial help and political rival crushing. They have tried to ask for financial help many times from Iran but the "14 March Alliance" has always opposed Iran's help as Iran always wanted to grip its claws to Lebanon with its militia/military proxy in Lebanon "Hezbollah".

Since the election of Michel Aoun as president in 2016 and the formation of a new Government headed by Prime Minister Saad Hariri , There were two sides, the March 14 alliance which surprisingly supported the election of Michel Aoun but only if mainly the Lebanese Forces having 7/20 of the governmental seats. Michel Aoun and Samir Geagea signed the "maarab agreement" and it was considered a historical peace between two rival and old political parties. Michel Aoun ended up not fiving the required seats to the Lebanese forces but samir geagea did not seem to complain until after the "17 october revolution" in Lebanon which samir geagea tried his best in trying to impress but to no avail. namely sides that were against the election of Michel Aoun as president in the 2016 elections, consisted of traditional non-sectarian parties such as the Kataeb party, the National Liberal Party. Since then, the political scene has been witnessing the emergence of new non-sectarian political groups such as Lihaqqi and Citizens in a State (MMFIDAWLA), in addition to many civil society groups who were loosely allied during the last parliamentary elections.Although they share a common goal to replace what they consider a failed political model, that was introduced following the end of the civil war leading to the 2020 economic crisis, they are not unified in order to assimilate and conquer the prevailing government.
The then-elected government has failed its duties as a government and the Prime Minister, Saad Hariri, attempted to resign while he was in Saudi Arabia in 2017, but it was ruled unconstitutional. Later on, during the October protests he resigned as Prime Minister. Moreover, he was later designated in October,2020 once again as Prime Minister nevertheless his attempt at creating a government did not take place.

The consociational power-sharing model that tries to minimise conflict and promote equality are not written in the Constitution of 1926, nor has it appeared in the post-Civil War Taef Agreement. Lebanon's unique experiment of a Sectarian Democracy trying to blend democratic principles and religious allocation of roles and functions together with 18 religious laws being applied to citizens’ personal status, in contradiction with the fundamental principles of democracy, the sovereignty of the people and equality of rights between the citizens has led to the sectarian division of the Lebanese people by law, to politically weak institutions, a divided nation and the chain of historical events such as the 1958 crisis and the 1975 civil war, Palestinian militant attacks against Israel from Lebanese territory, occupation of Lebanon by Syrian forces in 1976 and by Israeli forces in 1982 and the actual presence of weapons in the hands of Hezbollah outside the control of the Lebanese Government.  Article 24 of the Constitution assigns half the seats in the national's legislature, the Chamber of Deputies, to Christians and the other half to Muslims.

However, after the 2018 parliamentary elections, the political power in Lebanon shifted dramatically, with the Free Patriotic Movement leading in the number of seats in the Parliament and the Future Movement losing almost half of its seats. The Lebanese Forces almost doubled their seats in the Parliament.

Parties 

Although most parties maintain that they are secular, the major political parties in Lebanon are loosely representative of a certain faith community. In 2005, the political scene became strongly polarized with most active political parties belonging to either the 8th and 14 March alliances. Since then, this division has become less and less significant as coalition governments became the norm. The following list places political parties within the two alliances.

Parties currently represented in parliament

Other parties

March 8 Alliance

March 14 Alliance

Non-aligned

Defunct parties

See also 
 Politics of Lebanon
 List of political parties by country

References

Lebanon
 
Political parties
Political parties
Lebanon
Political parties